Backusburg is an unincorporated community in Calloway County, Kentucky, United States.

Two different archaeological sites are located near the community; one of them, known as the Backusburg Mounds, is one of the premier sites throughout the Jackson Purchase.  A post office was first established at the site on April 27, 1846, as Clarks River, Kentucky.  This post office was closed on July 6, 1860.  The post office was re-established on November 7, 1873, as Backusburg.  The town is said to have been named after Asa Backus (who co-owned a sawmill) after he won a coin flip with another man.

References

Unincorporated communities in Calloway County, Kentucky
Unincorporated communities in Kentucky